Raoul, Knight Mollet (28 November 1912 – 14 August 2002) was a Belgian modern pentathlete. He competed at the 1936 and 1948 Summer Olympics.

References

1912 births
2002 deaths
Belgian male modern pentathletes
Olympic modern pentathletes of Belgium
Modern pentathletes at the 1936 Summer Olympics
Modern pentathletes at the 1948 Summer Olympics
Sportspeople from Hainaut (province)